The  is an AC electric multiple unit (EMU) train type operated on local services by East Japan Railway Company (JR East), Aoimori Railway, and Iwate Galaxy Railway (IGR) in Japan. The design is derived from the 209 series commuter EMU, and was intended to replace locomotive-hauled trains formed of  coaches in the north of Japan.

Variants
 701-0 series: 2/3-car narrow-gauge sets based at Akita Depot
 701-100 series: 2/3-car narrow-gauge sets based at Akita and Sendai Depot
 701-1000 series: 2/4-car narrow-gauge sets based at Morioka and Sendai Depot
 701-1500 series: 2-car narrow-gauge sets based at Sendai Depot
 701-5000 series: 2-car standard-gauge sets based at Akita Depot
 701-5500 series: 2-car standard-gauge sets based at Yamagata Depot
 Aoimori 701 series: 2-car narrow-gauge sets operated by the Aoimori Railway
 IGR 7000 series: 2-car narrow-gauge sets operated by the Iwate Galaxy Railway

701-0 series

89 701-0 series cars were delivered in 1993, formed as three-car sets (N1 to N13) and two-car sets (N14 to N38), all based at Akita Depot. Three two-car sets (N36 to N38) were later modified with some transverse seating, and from 2005, the entire fleet had the original PS104 scissors-type pantographs replaced with PS109 single-arm pantographs. Snowploughs were also added to the front ends at the same time.

The sets with transverse seating are mainly used on the Ōu Main Line between Shinjō and Akita.

Formations

3-car sets N1-N13

The KuMoHa 701 car is fitted with one pantograph. The KuHa 700 car is fitted with a toilet and wheelchair space.

2-car sets N14-N38

The KuMoHa 701 car is fitted with one pantograph. The KuHa 700 car is fitted with a toilet and wheelchair space.

Interior

701-100 series

Thirteen 701-100 series cars were delivered in 1994, formed as one 3-car set and five 2-car sets. All sets were initially based at Akita Depot, but four of the 2-car sets were subsequently transferred to Sendai. The Akita-based sets had the original PS104 scissors-type pantographs replaced with PS109 single-arm pantographs between 2007 and 2008. Snowploughs were also added to the front ends at the same time. The Sendai-based sets had the original PS104 scissors-type pantographs replaced with lower-profile PS105 lozenge-type pantographs in 2002 to allow operation through limited-clearance tunnels on the Senzan Line.

They are also available for use on Senzan Line services if required. The Akita-based sets are used interchangeably alongside the 701-0 series sets.

Formations

3-car set N101

The KuMoHa 701 car is fitted with one pantograph. The KuHa 700 car is fitted with a toilet and wheelchair space.

2-car sets N102 and F2-103–106

The KuMoHa 701 car is fitted with one pantograph. The KuHa 700 car is fitted with a toilet and wheelchair space.

701-1000 series

92 701-1000 series cars were delivered between 1994 and 1995 to Morioka and Sendai depots, formed as 2- and 4-car units. As of 2010, 14 cars (seven 2-car sets), 30 cars (fifteen 2-car sets) are based at Morioka, and 36 cars (four 4-car sets and ten 2-car sets) are based at Sendai. Eight of the original 2-car sets were transferred to the Iwate Galaxy Railway Line, becoming IGR 7000-0 series (see below), and one 2-car set was transferred to the Aoimori Railway, becoming Aoimori 700-0 series (see below). On 28 October 1999, one Aomori-based 2-car set (KuMoHa 701-1033 + KuHa 700-1033) was damaged by storm surge at Aomori Station. New bodies were manufactured for this set in 2000, and it was renumbered KuMoHa 701-1508 + KuHa 700-1508 and reallocated to Sendai depot.

A further seven 701-1000 series two-car sets were transferred to the Aoimori Railway during 2010, becoming Aoimori 700-0 series.

Formations

4-car sets

The KuMoHa 701 and MoHa 701 cars are each fitted with one PS105 lozenge-type pantograph. The KuHa 700 car is fitted with a toilet and wheelchair space.

2-car sets

The KuMoHa 701 car is fitted with one PS105 lozenge-type pantograph. The KuHa 700 car is fitted with a toilet and wheelchair space.

701-1500 series

Eighteen two-car sets (numbered F2-501 to F2-518) were delivered to Sendai depot between 1998 and 2001, including set F2-508, which was rebuilt from an earlier damaged 701-1000 series unit. Sets from  F2-509 onward were fitted with wheelchair spaces and ATS-Ps from new. They are used interchangeably with Sendai 701-1000 series sets.

Formation

The KuMoHa 701 car is fitted with one PS105 lozenge-type pantograph. The KuHa 700 car is fitted with a toilet and wheelchair space.

701-5000 series

These sets were based on the earlier 701-1000 series, with some transverse seating, PS106 single-arm pantographs, and ATS-P.

Formation

The KuMoHa 701 car is fitted with one PS105 lozenge-type pantograph. The KuHa 700 car is fitted with a toilet and wheelchair space.

Interior

701-5500 series

During 2001, the original PS105 lozenge-type pantographs were replaced with PS106B single-arm pantographs. Snowploughs were added to the front ends at the same time.

The fleet of nine trainsets underwent a programme of refurbishment between 2013 and 2016. Improvements included replacement of electrical converters and transformers with similar equipment to that used on the later E721 series trains, as well as new flooring material internally.

Formation

The KuMoHa 701 car is fitted with one PS105 lozenge-type pantograph. The KuHa 700 car is fitted with a toilet and wheelchair space.

Aoimori 701 series

The Aoimori Railway 701 series fleet consists of one 701-0 series set, which was originally a JR East 701-1000 series set transferred from Morioka in December 2002, and a newly built 701-100 series set delivered in September 2002. The 701-100 series set has some transverse seating.

A further seven two-car (former 701-1000 series) sets were transferred from JR East during 2010 ahead of the transfer of passenger operations from JR East on the section from Hachinohe to Aomori when the Tohoku Shinkansen extension to Shin-Aomori opened in December 2010. These units are modified with the addition of some transverse seating. The Aoimori Railway fleet was repainted into a new lighter blue livery incorporating the railway's "Mori" mascot logo.

Formation

The Aoimori 701 car is fitted with a PS105 lozenge-type pantograph. The Aoimori 700 car is fitted with a toilet and wheelchair space.

IGR 7000 series

The Iwate Galaxy Railway Line 7000 series fleet consists of four 7000-0 series sets, which were originally JR East 701-1000 series sets transferred from Morioka in December 2002, and three newly built 7000-100 series sets delivered in September 2002. The 7000-100 series sets have some transverse seating.

Formations

IGR 7000-0 series

The IGR 7001 car is fitted with a PS105 lozenge-type pantograph. The IGR 7000 car is fitted with a toilet and wheelchair space.

IGR 7000-100 series

The IGR 7001 car is fitted with a PS105 lozenge-type pantograph. The IGR 7000 car is fitted with a toilet and wheelchair space.

Livery variations

References

External links

 JR East 701 series 

Electric multiple units of Japan
East Japan Railway Company
Train-related introductions in 1993
20 kV AC multiple units
Kawasaki multiple units